Claudinei Alexandre Aparecido (born 2 May 1980 in Avaré, São Paulo), known as Nei, is a Brazilian former professional footballer who last played for Trindade Atlético Clube as a striker.

Football career
After solid performances in Portugal for A.D. Ovarense in the second division (he arrived in the country at the age of 21 from Guarani Futebol Clube), Nei moved in the January 2005 transfer window to Moreirense F.C. in the Primeira Liga, making his debut on the 9th in a 1–0 home win against Académica de Coimbra and scoring four goals in the season's last three games – including one in a 1–1 home draw against FC Porto – as his team eventually suffered relegation.

Nei played one more year in Portugal in 2006–07, with Associação Naval 1º de Maio, his ten league goals being good enough for joint-fifth in the scorers' list, as the Figueira da Foz team finished 11th and retained their top level status. He then moved to Bulgaria with PFC CSKA Sofia, for €500.000: in his only season he netted a career-best 14 goals, also helping the side to the First Professional Football League championship.

Nei signed a two-year deal with Al-Shabab FC (Riyadh) of Saudi Arabia, being loaned to CFR Cluj in Romania in his second year and being a relatively important attacking unit as the team won the double. In July 2010, he was sold to Changchun Yatai F.C. from China.

On 11 January 2014, after having represented four clubs in quick succession, Nei returned to the Asian country, transferring to China League One's Tianjin Songjiang FC.

Honours
CSKA Sofia
Bulgarian League: 2007–08
Bulgarian Supercup: 2008

CFR Cluj
Liga I: 2009–10
Cupa României: 2009–10

References

External links
 
 Brazilian FA database 
 
 
 
 Slstat profile

1980 births
Living people
Footballers from São Paulo (state)
Brazilian footballers
Association football forwards
Campeonato Brasileiro Série B players
Guarani FC players
Grêmio Esportivo Anápolis players
Boa Esporte Clube players
Primeira Liga players
Liga Portugal 2 players
A.D. Ovarense players
Moreirense F.C. players
Associação Naval 1º de Maio players
First Professional Football League (Bulgaria) players
PFC CSKA Sofia players
Saudi Professional League players
Al-Shabab FC (Riyadh) players
Liga I players
CFR Cluj players
Chinese Super League players
China League One players
Changchun Yatai F.C. players
Tianjin Tianhai F.C. players
Brazilian expatriate footballers
Expatriate footballers in Portugal
Expatriate footballers in Bulgaria
Expatriate footballers in Saudi Arabia
Expatriate footballers in Romania
Expatriate footballers in China
Brazilian expatriate sportspeople in Portugal
Brazilian expatriate sportspeople in Bulgaria
Brazilian expatriate sportspeople in China
People from Avaré